Nina Taylor is an Australian politician. She has been a Labor Party member of the Victorian Legislative Assembly, representing the district of Albert Park since November 2022. She was previously a member of the Victorian Legislative Council between 2018 and 2022, representing the Southern Metropolitan Region. She is the Parliamentary Secretary for Training and Skills since December 2022 and was previously the Parliamentary Secretary for Health. She also previously served as Government Whip in the Legislative Council from October 2020 to August 2022.

Prior to Taylor's election into the Victorian Parliament, she was a councillor for the City of Glen Eira from 2016 to 2018.

Early life and career before politics 
Taylor was born in Melbourne, Victoria. She attended Parkdale Primary School and completed her VCE at Firbank Grammar School. She graduated a Bachelor of Arts (BA) at Monash University and proceeded to attain a Postgraduate Diploma of Education (DipEd) from the University of Queensland; she has also completed a Bachelor of Laws (LLB) at the University of Melbourne. As part of her school teaching education and training, she accomplished the Zertifikat C1 - früher Zentrale Mittelstufenprüfung (Advanced German language and culture) under a scholarship from the Goethe Institut. She is fluent in English, French, and German.

Taylor's first career roles were in secondary school teaching, in education of chronic disease management within the pharmaceutical industry, and in promotion and advocacy in the disability space. She completed articles at Quinert, Rodda and Associates while volunteering at the Melbourne office of the Women's Legal Service, and moved on to become a union organiser in the Community and Public Sector Union prior to her entry into politics.

Political career 
Taylor represented Tucker Ward as a Glen Eira City councillor from 2016 to 2018, where her advocacy focused on low carbon transport and sustainability measures at the local level.

Taylor was elected in the 2018 Victorian state election as one of two Labor members for Southern Metropolitan Region in the Legislative Council of the 59th Parliament of Victoria. In this capacity, she has held memberships in the Legislative Council Environment and Planning Committee (March 2019 - April 2022), the Public Accounts and Estimates Committee (October 2020 – present), and the Legislative Council Legal and Social Issues Committee (April 2022 – present).

In October 2020, Taylor was appointed as Government Whip of the Legislative Council and held this role until August 2022. In June 2022, she was appointed a Parliamentary Secretary for Health.

In July 2022, Taylor was pre-selected to contest the 2022 Victorian state election as the Labor candidate for the Legislative Assembly district of Albert Park, triggered by the announcement of incumbent Labor member Martin Foley in June 2022 that he would be retiring from politics. She was successfully elected at the election and was appointed as Parliamentary Secretary for Training and Skills after the election.

Personal life
Taylor lives in Southbank within her electorate of Albert Park.

References

Year of birth missing (living people)
Living people
Australian Labor Party members of the Parliament of Victoria
Members of the Victorian Legislative Council
Women members of the Victorian Legislative Council
Victoria (Australia) local councillors
Women local councillors in Australia
21st-century Australian politicians
21st-century Australian women politicians
Labor Left politicians